Alexander Ramón Ramírez Quiñónez (born 3 October 1974) is a Venezuelan-born Japanese former professional baseball outfielder who had a long career in Nippon Professional Baseball (NPB). He is the first foreign-born player to record 2,000 hits while playing in NPB. Before playing in Japan, he played in Major League Baseball (MLB) for the Cleveland Indians (1998–2000) and Pittsburgh Pirates (2000). He batted and threw right-handed.

In October 2015 he was named as the BayStars manager for the 2016 season.

Professional baseball career

American minor leagues
He was named the Indians' 1998 Minor League Player of the Year (receiving the "Lou Boudreau Award").

Major League Baseball
Ramírez made his MLB debut with the Cleveland Indians in 1998. On 28 July 2000, the Indians traded Ramírez and Enrique Wilson to the Pittsburgh Pirates for Wil Cordero. Across three MLB seasons, Ramírez batted .259 with 12 home runs, 48 runs batted in (RBI), 38 runs scored, 17 doubles, three triples, and three stolen bases in 135 games played.

Nippon Professional Baseball career

After the 2000 season, Ramírez signed with the Yakult Swallows (2001–2007) and was their cleanup hitter. During his final season with the Swallows he set the Central League record for most base hits in a single season with 204. (This record did not stand long as Hanshin Tigers outfielder Matt Murton surpassed Ramírez's tally en route to finishing the 2010 season with 214 hits.)

The 2007 season, however, proved to be Ramírez's last with the Swallows, who did offer him the multi-year contract he sought. Instead, the outfielder signed with the Yomiuri Giants for the 2008 season. Ramírez quickly flourished with his new team. In 2008, he led the Central League with 125 RBI while hitting .319 (6th in the league) with 45 home runs (2nd). He also hit two home runs in Game 2 of the Japan Series, including one in the bottom of the ninth to win Game 2. At the end of the 2008 season, Ramírez won the Central League MVP Award. He was the third Venezuelan player to be so honored in Japanese Baseball, joining Roberto Petagine (Central League, 2001) and Alex Cabrera (Pacific League, 2002).

After playing eight seasons in NPB, Ramirez obtained FA Right in 2008 and was no longer counted as a foreign player for roster purposes. As of 2017, only four foreign players in NPB history had accrued enough service time to achieve the classification.

On 6 April 2013, Ramirez hit a home run to record his 2,000 career hit in the NPB, becoming the 42nd player and the first foreign player to accomplish the feat. This accomplishment also earned Ramírez an invitation to the Meikyukai, a private club recognizing Japan's elite players. He was the first Western player to be so honored.

Baseball Challenge League 
Ramírez spent the 2014 season as a player-coach with the Gunma Diamond Pegasus of Japan's Baseball Challenge League. In 45 games, he hit .305 with 7 home runs and 38 RBI. He retired after the 2014 season and signed on as the Diamond Pegasus' Senior Director.

Coaching
In the middle of the 2015 Ramírez joined the Orix Buffaloes as an advisor, mentoring younger players. In October 2015 he was named as the BayStars manager for the 2016 season, replacing Kiyoshi Nakahata who resigned at the end of the 2015 season due to the team's poor performance. In his first season managing, the team finished 69-71-3, finishing third in the Central League, and advancing to the Climax Series, where the BayStars defeated the Yomiuri Giants, 2-1 in the first round before falling to the Hiroshima Toyo Carp, 4-1, in the league championship round. In his second year as manager, the BayStars reached the 2017 Japan Series, but lost to the Fukuoka SoftBank Hawks, 4-2.

Career statistics

Statistics current as of 21 November 2014

Business career
In February 2013, Alex Ramirez started, with his wife and his son, a restaurant in Tokyo, Japan, called Ramichan Cafe, serving the cuisine of Puerto Rico, where his wife grew up. The restaurant has since closed.

Ramirez has spoken about his faith saying, "I believe (continuing to play baseball) is my desire, but it's not my life. God has already blessed me with this career, and whatever God has planned for me, I will be happy to follow that, whether or not I play baseball again. It's not what I want; it's what God wants for me."

As of January 2019, he has naturalised as a Japanese national.

See also

 List of Major League Baseball players from Venezuela

References

External links

 
 Retrosheet
 
 Venezuelan Professional Baseball League statistics
 Alex Ramirez Web Site
 Yokohama star Ramírez keeps family close to his heart
 Alex Ramirez "Ramichan Cafe"

1974 births
Living people
Águilas del Zulia players
Bakersfield Blaze players
Buffalo Bisons (minor league) players
Burlington Indians players (1986–2006)
Canton-Akron Indians players
Cardenales de Lara players
Caribes de Oriente players
Cleveland Indians players
Columbus RedStixx players
Japanese Baseball Hall of Fame inductees
Japanese Christians
Venezuelan emigrants to Japan
Kinston Indians players
Major League Baseball outfielders
Major League Baseball players from Venezuela
Managers of baseball teams in Japan
Nippon Professional Baseball left fielders
Nippon Professional Baseball MVP Award winners
Naturalized citizens of Japan
Baseball players from Caracas
Pittsburgh Pirates players
Sportspeople from Winter Haven, Florida
Tokyo Yakult Swallows players
Venezuelan Christians
Venezuelan expatriate baseball players in Japan
Venezuelan expatriate baseball players in the United States
Yakult Swallows players
Yokohama DeNA BayStars players
Yokohama DeNA BayStars managers
Yomiuri Giants players